The House of Sapieha (Sapieha) is a Polish-Lithuanian noble and magnate family of Lithuanian and Ruthenian origin, descending from the medieval boyars of Smolensk and Polotsk. The family acquired great influence and wealth in the Polish–Lithuanian Commonwealth during the 16th century.

History
The first confirmed records of the Sapieha family date back to the 15th century, when Semen Sopiha was mentioned as a writer (scribe) of the then King of Poland and Grand Duke of Lithuania, Casimir IV Jagiellon for the period of 1441–49. Semen had two sons, Bohdan and Iwan.

Possibly, the family of Semen Sopiha owned the village of Sopieszyno near Gdansk, which they left because of the Teutonic invasion. Sopieszyno is one of the oldest Pomeranian villages. The records have it that already in the 11th-12th centuries it was a knightly estate. It was then mentioned in 1399 as a village owned in fiefdom by knights subject to the Polish Crown. Their family could be involved in the Baltic-Volga trade, as many Pomeranian families. The family descended from Ukrainian boyars subject to Lithuania.

The creator of the fortune and power of the Sapieha family was the Court and Great Chancellor and Great Hetman of Lithuania, Lew Sapieha.

The princely title of the Sapieha-Kodenski branch was recognized in Poland in 1572 and in Austria-Hungary in 1845, while that of the Sapieha-Rozanski line was officially acknowledged in Russia in 1880.

On 14 September 1700, Michał Franciszek Sapieha had obtained the title of prince from Emperor Leopold I, but the title became extinct upon his death on 19 November 1700. That year, the family lost its dominant position in the Grand Duchy as a result of its defeat in the Lithuanian Civil War. In 1768, members of the Sapieha family obtained recognition of the princely title from the Polish Sejm. After the partitions of Poland, the family appeared in the list of persons authorised to bear the title of Prince of the Kingdom of Poland in 1824. The title was recognised in Austria in 1836 and 1840, and in Russia in 1874 and 1901. In 1905, the family obtained the qualification of Serene Highness in Austria.

The maternal grandmother of Queen Mathilde of Belgium was a Princess of the house of Sapieha.

Coat of arms

The Sapieha family used the Polish coat of arms named "Lis".

Notable members
 Adam Stefan Sapieha (1867–1951), cardinal, archbishop of Kraków
 Adam Zygmunt Sapieha (1892–1970), cavalryman, aviator
 Aleksander Michał Sapieha (1730–1793), voivode of Płock, Field Lithuanian Hetman, Grand Lithuanian Chancellor, marshal of the Lithuanian Tribunal
 Aleksander Sapieha (1888–1976), aviator
 Andrzej Józef Sapieha (1894–1945), he participated in the Polish–Soviet War, member of the Armia Krajowa
 Andrzej Sapieha (1539–1621), Great Royal Deputy Cup-bearer of Lithuania, castellan of Minsk, and Voivode of Polotsk and Smolensk
 Anna Zofia Sapieha (1799–1864), wife of Adam Jerzy Czartoryski
 Arabella Theresa Sapieha (1960), Princess Sapieha-Rozanski
Bohdan Sapieha, several people
 Eustachy Kajetan Sapieha (1797–1860), he participated in the November uprising, politically tied with the "Hôtel Lambert"
 Eustachy Sapieha (1881–1963), politician, Polish Minister of Foreign Affairs 1920-1921
 Eustachy Seweryn Sapieha (1916–2004), hunter, historian of the Sapieha family
 Franciszek Sapieha (1772–1829), general, he participated in the Kościuszko uprising
 Fryderyk Sapieha (1599–1650), voivode of Mścisław, podkomorzy of Vitebsk
 Kazimierz Lew Sapieha (1607–1656), Marshal of the Crown, son of Lew Sapieha
 Jan Andrzej Sapieha (1910–1989), head of House Sapieha, he participated in the Defence War of 1939
 Jan Fryderyk Sapieha (1680–1751), Grand Recorder of Lithuania
 Jan Kazimierz Sapieha the Elder (?–1730), Grand Hetman of Lithuania
 Jan Kazimierz Sapieha the Younger, (ca. 1642–1720), Field Hetman
 Jan Pavel Sapieha-Rozanski (1935) head of House Sapieha, sometime Belgian ambassador to Brazil
 Jan Piotr Sapieha (1569–1611), Polish royal officer
 Jan Stanisław Sapieha (1589–1635), Court Marshal of Lithuania, Great Lithuanian Marshal
 Józef Sapieha, he participated in the Polish–Soviet War
 Karol Władysław Sapieha (1920–1941), pilot of the Polish Air Forces in Great Britain in World War II
 Kazimierz Nestor Sapieha (1757–1798), political activist, general
 Leon Aleksander Sapieha (1883–1944), landlord, member of the Sejm, member of Związek Walki Zbrojnej and the Armia Krajowa
 Leon Roman Sapieha (1915–1940), pilot of the Polish Air Forces in Great Britain in World War II
 Leon Sapieha (1803–1878), political and economic activist
 Lew Jerzy Sapieha (1913–1990), poet, writer
 Lew Sapieha (1557–1633), Court Chancellor and Great Hetman of Lithuania
 Maria Sapieha (1910–2009), social activist
 Michał Franciszek Sapieha (1670–1700), General, Koniuszy
 Mikołaj Krzysztof Sapieha (1613–1639), voivode of Minsk
 Mikołaj Sapieha (1581–1644), voivode of Minsk and of Brześć Litewski, castellan of Vilnius
 Mikołaj Sapieha (1588–1638), voivode of Minsk and of Nowogródek
 Paola Maria de Bourbon Orléans e Bragança Sapieha (1983), model and product designer, wife of fashion photographer Prince Constantin Swiatopolk-Czetwertyński
 Paweł Jan Sapieha (1609–1665), voivode of the Witebsk and Vilnius, Great Hetman of Lithuania
 Paweł Maria Sapieha (1900–1987), he participated in the Polish–Soviet War
 Paweł Sapieha (1860–1934), traveler, first chairman of the Polish Red Cross
 Paweł Stefan Sapieha (1565–1635), Deputy Chancellor of Lithuania
 Róża Maria Sapieha (1921–1944), member of the Armia Krajowa, she participated in the Warsaw uprising of 1944
 Stanisław Sapieha (1896–1919), defender of Lwów
 Teresa Sapieha (died c.1784), wife of Hieronim Florian Radziwiłł and Joachim Karol Potocki
 Tomasz Sapieha (1598–1646), voivode of Wenden and of Nowogródek
 Władysław Leon Sapieha (1853–1920), landowner, social activist

Palaces

See also
Ruzhany Palace
Sapieha Palace in Vilnius
Sapieha Palace in Warsaw
Sapieha Palace in Lviv
Polish nobility
Belarusian nobility
Lithuanian nobility
List of szlachta
Sapieha beaker

Bibliography
 Labarre de Raillicourt, Dominique., Histoire des Sapieha (1440-1970), Paris, 1970
 Sapieha E., Dom Sapieżyński, Warszawa 1995. Numery /112 przy nazwiskach oznaczają numery biogramów w/w pozycji.
 Tłomacki A., "Sapiehowie Kodeńscy", nakładem własnym, Warszawa 2009

References

 
Surnames